Cowpen Creek is a stream in the U.S. state of Georgia.

A variant name was "Jones Cowpen Creek."

References

Rivers of Georgia (U.S. state)
Rivers of Washington County, Georgia